The pink-footed puffback (Dryoscopus angolensis) is a species of bird in the family Malaconotidae.

It is found in western Central Africa as well as in the Albertine Rift montane forests and northern adjacent areas of Kenya, Uganda and the eastern Congo Basin. Its natural habitat is subtropical or tropical moist montane forests.

References

pink-footed puffback
Birds of Central Africa
Birds of Sub-Saharan Africa
pink-footed puffback
Taxonomy articles created by Polbot